Sergey Kazakov (born July 8, 1976) is a Russian amateur boxer best known to win the World Championships 2003 and European Championships 1998, 2002 and 2004 in the Men's Light Flyweight.

Kazakov won the European Championships in 1998. In 2000 he lost at the European Championships to Valeriy Sydorenko in the finals and at the Olympics 2000 against reigning world champ Brian Viloria (6:8) in the first round.
In 2003 he won the World Championships with a close final victory against future star Zou Shiming (23:19).
He added a victory at the European championships 2002 and 2004 by beating Alfonso Pinto.
2004 at the Olympics he was upset by young Turk Atagün Yalçınkaya and had to settle for bronze.
2005 at the world championships he again lost to a teenager in Hungary's Pal Bedak.

In 2005 he was part of the Russian team that won the Boxing World Cup.

2007 he lost at the Russian Championships against David Ayrapetyan 9:25.

Results

Olympic Games
2000 (Sydney, as a Light flyweight)
Lost to Brian Viloria (United States) 6-8

2004 (Athens, as a Light flyweight)
Defeated Patricio Calero (Ecuador) 20-8
Defeated Raúl Castañeda (Mexico) 41-16
Defeated Joseph Jermia (Namibia) 18-11
Lost to Atagün Yalçınkaya (Turkey) 20-26

World Championships
2003 (Bangkok, as a Light flyweight)
Defeated Mohamed Ali Qamar (India) 18-5
Defeated Suban Pannon (Thailand) 37-24
Defeated Noman Karim (Pakistan) 23-4
Defeated Zou Shiming (PR China) 23-19

2005 (Mianyang, as a Light flyweight)
Defeated Darren Langley (England) 23-12
Lost to Pál Bedák (Hungary) 16-24

European Championships
1998 (Minsk, as a Light flyweight)
Defeated Ruslan Bespalov (Belarus) 11-3
Defeated Marian Velicu (Romania) 4-2
Defeated Oleg Kiryukhin (Ukraine) 7-5
Defeated Ivanas Stapovičius (Lithuania) 4-0

World Cup
2005 (Moscow, as a Light flyweight)
Defeated Anton Bekesh (Belarus) 35-11
Defeated Vincent Montoya (United States) RSC-2
Lost to Yan Bartelemí (Cuba) 14-26

References

External links 
Russian Championships 2007
 sports-reference

1976 births
Living people
Boxers at the 2000 Summer Olympics
Boxers at the 2004 Summer Olympics
Olympic boxers of Russia
Olympic bronze medalists for Russia
Olympic medalists in boxing
Medalists at the 2004 Summer Olympics
Russian male boxers
AIBA World Boxing Championships medalists
Light-flyweight boxers
Sportspeople from Ulyanovsk